Jana A. Shelfer (nee Stump; born 1975) is an American Paralympic wheelchair basketball player. She has won a bronze medal at the 1996 Summer Paralympics and a gold medal at the 2004 Summer Paralympics.

Early life
Stump was born and raised in Belleville, Kansas to parents Jerry and Kathleen. In 1990, on the last day of her freshman year, she became paralyzed after a seat belt broke and threw her into the backseat. After returning to high school in a wheelchair, she was crowned Young Woman of the Year at 18 years old.

Career
After graduating from Belleville High School, she accepted a basketball scholarship at the University of Illinois at Urbana–Champaign. She was a member of Delta Gamma while majoring in Broadcast Journalism. During the 1995–96 season, she was named to the United States women's national wheelchair basketball team to compete at the 1996 Summer Paralympics. As the youngest player on the roster, she helped Team USA win a bronze medal. Upon her return, Stump was named to the NCAA First All–Tournament Team and awarded the Most Improved Player Award. She was also awarded the Pamela Borelli and Family Leadership Achievement Award. The next year, she received the Fourth Year Award before graduating.

In 2004, she was named to the United States women's national wheelchair basketball team that won a gold medal at the 2004 Summer Paralympics. With her broadcasting degree, Stump moved to Orlando to work in media relations for Walt Disney World and at WMFE-FM.

References

External links
Paralympic profile

People from Belleville, Kansas
Sportspeople from Kansas
Basketball players from Tacoma, Washington
1975 births
Living people
American women's wheelchair basketball players
Paralympic gold medalists for the United States
Paralympic bronze medalists for the United States
Medalists at the 1996 Summer Paralympics
Medalists at the 2004 Summer Paralympics
American disabled sportspeople
University of Illinois Urbana-Champaign alumni
Paralympic medalists in wheelchair basketball
Wheelchair basketball players at the 1996 Summer Paralympics
Wheelchair basketball players at the 2004 Summer Paralympics
Paralympic wheelchair basketball players of the United States
21st-century American women